Youth Connection Charter School (YCCS) is the largest charter school in the United States. Founded in 1997 it is the only charter school in Illinois that targets dropouts and other at-risk students. In 2010 YCCS served over 3,500 students through 23 campuses throughout Chicago.

Campuses
 Ada S. McKinley Lakeside
 ASA – Community Services West
 Antonia Pantoja – Aspira
 Austin Career Education Center
 CCA – Community Services West
 Chatham Academy 
 Charles Houston 
 Community Youth Development Institute
 Dr. Pedro Albizu Campos High School
 El Cuarto Año – Association House
 Howard Area Alternative
 Innovations High School
 Jane Addams High School
 Latino Youth High School – Pilsen Wellness Center
 Olive – Harvey Middle College
 Options Laboratory School
 Sullivan House
 Truman Middle College
 Westside Holistic Leadership Academy
 West Town Academy
 YCCS Virtual High School / Stride, Inc. at Malcolm X College
 Youth Connection Leadership Academy

References

Educational institutions established in 1997
Chicago Public Schools
Public high schools in Chicago
Charter schools in Chicago
1997 establishments in Illinois